This is a list of spouses of the prime minister of Sweden.

The spouse of the prime minister of Sweden is not an official office, although she or he plays a spouse role during official visits.

The current prime minister, Ulf Kristersson, is married to Birgitta Ed since 1991.

United Kingdom of Sweden and Norway (1876–1905)

Kingdom of Sweden (1905–present)

See also 
 Prime Minister of Sweden
 List of prime ministers of Sweden

Lists of Swedish politicians
Politics of Sweden
Swedish prime ministers